Rhododendron tatsienense (syn. Rhododendron hypophaeum) is a species of flowering plant in the family Ericaceae, native to south-central China. It resembles Rhododendron davidsonianum and R.siderophyllum.

Subtaxa
The following varieties are accepted:
Rhododendron tatsienense var. nudatum  – northwestern Yunnan
Rhododendron tatsienense var. tatsienense – Sichuan, northern Yunnan, Guizhou

References

tatsienense
Endemic flora of China
Flora of South-Central China
Plants described in 1895